Barilius profundus is a fish in genus Barilius of the family Cyprinidae. It is found in India.

References 

P
Taxa named by Waikhom Vishwanath
Fish described in 2012